Khamsa is a 2008 film.

Synopsis 
After fleeing from his foster family, Khamsa returns to the gypsy camp where he was born eleven years ago. With his cousin, Tony "The Midget", Khamsa dreams of getting rich with cock fights. Nothing seems to have changed since he left, the card games, the Mediterranean Sea… Until his best friend, Coyote, meets Rachitique, a small-time crook. Very soon they pass from stealing scooters to armed robbery, and Khamsa quickly spirals down into delinquency.

External links 

 

2008 films
French drama films
German drama films
Tunisian drama films
2000s French films
2000s German films